Karl Kobelt (1 August 1891, in St. Gallen – 6 January 1968) was a Swiss politician and member of the Swiss Federal Council.

He was elected to the Federal Council on 10 December 1940 and handed over office on 31 December 1954. He was affiliated to the Free Democratic Party.

During his time in office he held the Military Department. On 2 December 1944 Kobelt contacted Brigadier General B. R. Legge related to internees, among others in the Wauwilermoos internment camp near Luzern. Kobelt was President of the Confederation twice in 1946 and 1952.

References

External links 
 
 
 

1891 births
1968 deaths
People from St. Gallen (city)
Swiss Calvinist and Reformed Christians
Free Democratic Party of Switzerland politicians
Members of the Federal Council (Switzerland)
Members of the National Council (Switzerland)
Swiss military officers
ETH Zurich alumni